Frederick "Frank" Douglas Fletcher was an Australian sailor, mainly known for his time as chief officer of the  during the 1911–1914 Australasian Antarctic expedition, under Captain John King Davis.

Fletcher replaced N. C. Toutcher—who had been chief officer during Auroras first voyage of the expedition—for the second Antarctic voyage, and the spring and winter sub-Antarctic voyages of 1912 and 1913.

In his 1962 book High Latitude, Davis described Fletcher as "a most efficient and conscientious officer and seaman who at first sight might have been taken for the prototype of the perfect 'Bucko', that semi-legendary figure sometimes described as having 'a jaw like a sea boot'." Fletcher left the Aurora in 1913 to join a coastal shipping company, presumably in New Zealand, where he was discharged.

Expedition commander Douglas Mawson named Fletcher Island—near Commonwealth Bay—after him.

References 

Australasian Antarctic Expedition
Australian sailors